72 kDa inositol polyphosphate 5-phosphatase, also known as phosphatidylinositol-4,5-bisphosphate 5-phosphatase or Pharbin, is an enzyme that in humans is encoded by the INPP5E gene.

Function 

INPP5E is a phosphatidylinositol (3,4,5)-trisphosphate (PtdInsP3) and phosphatidylinositol 4,5-bisphosphate 5-phosphatase. Its intracellular localization is the primary cilium, a small organelle involved in signal transduction. INPP5E plays a role in hydrolyzing PtdInsP3 produced in response to various growth factors such as PDGF. Inactivation of the mouse INPP5E gene decreases primary cilia stability, leading to a multiorgan disorder, including absence of eyes, polydactyly, exencephaly and renal cysts.

Clinical significance 

Mutations in the INPP5E  are associated with MORM syndrome and Joubert syndrome.

References

Further reading 

 
 
 
 

EC 3.1.3